Mirko Casper (born 1 March 1982 in Zell (Mosel), Rhineland-Palatinate) is a German former professional footballer who played as a defender.

References

1982 births
Living people
People from Zell (Mosel)
German footballers
Association football defenders
FSV Salmrohr players
Alemannia Aachen players
Bundesliga players
2. Bundesliga players
Footballers from Rhineland-Palatinate